The 2006 season was the Chicago Bears' 87th in the National Football League (NFL). The team improved on their 11–5 record from 2005 and finished with a 13–3 record; the best in the NFC. The Bears retained their NFC North divisional title, and won the NFC Championship against the New Orleans Saints, on January 21, 2007. The Bears played the Indianapolis Colts in Super Bowl XLI, where they lost 29–17. They finished the 2006 NFL season tied for second in points scored, and third in points allowed.

Due to the NFL's scheduling formula the Bears played 6 intra-division games, posting a record of 5–1. Because of rotating cycle scheduling, the Bears matched up against all four teams in the AFC East (going 2–2) and NFC West (going 4–0). In the remaining games, the Bears played the NFC's other reigning division winners, the Tampa Bay Buccaneers and New York Giants, posting a record of 2–0. During the entire season, the Bears played 10 games at home, 8 games on the road, and 1 game at a neutral field for the Super Bowl. Including the playoffs and Super Bowl, the Bears finished with a record of 15–4.

Noteworthy football stories for the 2006 season were replacing retired cornerback and kick returner Jerry Azumah, the quarterback controversy between productive but inconsistent and potentially fragile Rex Grossman and veteran free agent Brian Griese, the  record setting returns by Devin Hester, Bernard Berrian's breakout season, competition between the Bears' running backs (Cedric Benson and Thomas Jones), and 5th round draft pick Mark Anderson's 12 quarterback sacks as a rookie.

This was the most recent time the Bears would have back to back winning seasons.

Offseason

2006 NFL Draft picks

The Chicago Bears’ 2006 NFL Draft picks drew much criticism from various Bears’ fans and local sports critics. After injuries plagued the Bears’ offensive depth chart, the team finished the 2005 NFL season ranked 31st in passing yardage per game. Many fans assumed that the Bears would draft a tight end or wide receiver to improve the offense. However, Jerry Angelo and Lovie Smith surprised the media by trading away the Bears’ first round draft pick, and drafting five defensive players. Devin Hester was drafted to fill the void left by former cornerback Jerry Azumah and punt returner Bobby Wade, while Danieal Manning could provide additional depth to the Bears’ secondary while also being potentially available for punt and kick returns, as his highest prospect grade came in kick returning. Additionally, Anderson and Dvoracek were drafted to add depth to the Bears’ defensive line.

Training camp
The preseason featured a brewing quarterback controversy when Rex Grossman struggled in his exhibition appearances and newly signed veteran back-up Brian Griese moved the second team offense freely.

The competition for the starting running back position went to Thomas Jones by default after sophomore running back Cedric Benson missed every preseason game with a shoulder injury inflicted in practice by Brian Urlacher and Mike Brown.

Preseason

Uniform combinations

During the 2006 season, the Bears reintroduced three combinations of jerseys. During their week eight game against the San Francisco 49ers, the Bears wore special orange jerseys in the spirit of Halloween.  They also wore all-white uniforms during their final two away games. Additionally, the Bears wore all-blue uniforms during their season finale against the Green Bay Packers.

Schedule

Standings

Game summaries

Week 1: at Green Bay Packers

The Bears began their season on a victorious note by defeating the Green Bay Packers. Widely considered  one of the league's most storied rivalries, the Bears and Packers had previously met 28 times at Lambeau Field for a season opener. Notably, this was the first shutout ever for the Packers with quarterback Brett Favre at the helm.

Week 2: vs. Detroit Lions

The Bears began a winning streak by defeating the Detroit Lions at Soldier Field. The game drew more media attention than usual when Roy Williams of the Detroit Lions guaranteed a victory against the Bears.

Week 3: at Minnesota Vikings

The Bears offense was limited by a resurgent Minnesota Vikings defense, but fourth-quarter heroics from both the offense and defense resulted in a 19–16 victory.

Week 4: vs. Seattle Seahawks

Taking advantage of an injured Shaun Alexander, who did not play, and playing very well on both sides of the ball, the Bears defeated the defending NFC Champion Seattle Seahawks at Soldier Field by a score of 37–6 on the Bears' first night game of the year.

Week 5: vs. Buffalo Bills

Week five marked the return of former Bears head coach Dick Jauron to Soldier Field. It would also be the second straight week in which the Bears defeated their opponent by more than 30 points.

Week 6: at Arizona Cardinals

The Bears traveled to the newly opened University of Phoenix Stadium to play the Arizona Cardinals, their former cross-town rivals. While many expected the game a lop-sided affair in favor of the 5–0 Bears, the Cardinals led the Bears before stumbling in the game's last quarter. The game marked the Bears’ first Monday Night Football appearance since the 2003 NFL season, and second overall prime-time appearance of the season. The game started on an auspicious note for the Cardinals, as Rex Grossman faced a quick three and out after failing to connect to Bernard Berrian on a deep pass. The Cardinals responded offensively when rookie quarterback Matt Leinart threw two touchdowns in the first quarter. As Neil Rackers helped bolster the Cardinals lead with a set of field goals, Grossman continued to struggle and committed four turnovers in the first half alone. By half time, the Cardinals were leading the Bears by a score of 20–0, which was the largest deficit they had faced all season at that point.

The Bears finally got on the score board in the third quarter when Robbie Gould kicked a 23-yard field goal. However, Rackers responded again to boost the Cardinals lead back to twenty points. By the game's third quarter, many had assumed the Cardinals had grasped their second win of the season, and the undefeated Bears would be forced to face defeat. However, in the dying minutes of the third quarter, the Bears’ defense made a series of staunch defensive plays that allowed them to rally back.

First, rookie defensive end Mark Anderson sacked Leinart, causing him to fumble. The loose ball was picked up by Mike Brown, who returned it for a 3-yard touchdown. Later, Brian Urlacher stripped the ball from running back Edgerrin James, and Charles Tillman recovered the football and returned it for another touchdown. The Bears, now only trailing by six points, took the lead when rookie punt returner Devin Hester returned a punt for an 83-yard touchdown. The Cardinals had one final attempt to win the game, but Rackers missed a 40-yard field goal attempt, allowing the Bears to kneel the clock out. After the game's conclusion, Dennis Green, who was the Cardinal's coach at the time, threw his infamous "They are who we thought they were!" postgame conference. The rant became so popular, that it was featured in a Coors Light commercial the next season.

Week 7: Bye
Celebration of the Bears' improbable win over Arizona was tempered by the news that starting safety Mike Brown was lost for the season with torn ligaments in his foot. The rest of the team was able to work toward renewed good health for the San Francisco game.

Week 8: vs. San Francisco 49ers

Week 8 saw the Bears return to Soldier Field to play the San Francisco 49ers. Prior to the game, Lovie Smith announced that the Bears would don their alternative orange jerseys to commemorate the upcoming Halloween holiday, and asked Bear fans to wear orange clothing to create an “orange swarm” at Soldier Field. The Bears' 41 point first half tied the franchise record for most points scored in one half, the other game being the 1940 NFL Championship, where the Bears defeated the Washington Redskins 73–0.

Week 9: vs. Miami Dolphins

Week 9 saw the Bears take on the Joey Harrington-led Miami Dolphins and fall to 7–1 with their first loss of the season. Miami defensive end Jason Taylor recorded a sack, a forced fumble, and a 20-yard pick-six.

Week 10: at New York Giants

The Bears traveled to Giants Stadium to face the New York Giants. The game was highly anticipated, as it was the first game in  league history to benefit from the NFL's flexible scheduling.  Furthermore, leading up to the game Giants receiver Plaxico Burress provided plenty of fodder for the Chicago media by calling the Bears’ cornerbacks “average”. Nevertheless, the Bears went on to beat the Giants by a score of 38–20. The win over the Giants allowed the Bears to hold their first-place ranking in the National Football Conference. Devin Hester was also able to tie a record 108-yard return for a touchdown shared by teammate Nathan Vasher.

Week 11: at New York Jets

For week eleven, the Chicago Bears returned to Giants Stadium to play the New York Jets. While the Bears managed to record their second shut-out win of the year, their offense struggled throughout the first half the game, and managed only ten points in the second half. The victory over the Jets marked the first time in two games that the Bears did not turn over the ball, and Robbie Gould had not failed to convert a field goal or extra point on the year.

Week 12: at New England Patriots

Following two consecutive wins at Giants Stadium, the Bears were to finish a three-game road trip at Gillette Stadium against the New England Patriots. Similar to the week nine confrontation with the Miami Dolphins, turnovers contributed to the Bears’ 17–13 loss against the Patriots.  The opening two quarters were a story of turnovers in a Rex Grossman interception by Asante Samuel, a Benjamin Watson catch knocked into the hands of Charles Tillman, a blocked Bears field goal attempt, and fumbles by Laurence Maroney and Grossman.   The third quarter saw a bizarre sequence of turnovers – first fumbles by both Watson and Reche Caldwell on the same play, followed by another Samuel interception of Grossman, and finally a second Tillman interception of Brady.   Through three quarters the game was tied 10–10 before a drive where Brady faked out Brian Urlacher on a nine-yard run ended in a two-yard score to Watson.  Turnovers then ended the game, with a Corey Dillon fumble followed by Samuel's third interception of Grossman.  Samuel's three picks tied Roland James in Patriots history for three interceptions in one game.

Week 13: vs. Minnesota Vikings

After the loss to New England, the Bears returned to Soldier Field to play the Minnesota Vikings. The weather conditions were harsh throughout the game; the below-freezing temperatures and swirling winds provided a clichéd background for a rivalry game in the "Black and Blue Division".  Despite a marginal offensive performance, the Bears managed to defeat the Vikings 23–13.

With their tenth win of the season, the Bears secured their second consecutive NFC North Title. Additionally, the Bears became the first team in the NFL to clinch a playoff berth, and remained tied for the NFL's best record.

Week 14: at St. Louis Rams

For week 14, the Bears traveled to St. Louis, Missouri to play the St. Louis Rams. Prior to the game, a quarterback controversy arose between Rex Grossman and Brian Griese regarding the Bears’ starting quarterback position. Grossman, who finished the preceding game with a quarterback rating of 1.3, was eager to make a statement, and rebound against the same team which injured him during the previous year's preseason. Grossman rose to the occasion, and spearheaded the Bears to a 42–27 victory over the Rams, while rookie CB Devin Hester had a record-breaking performance. Also, many spectators of the Monday night game may remember then-Senator Barack Obama's humorous television introduction before kickoff.

During the course of the game, Hester broke the NFL record for combined return touchdowns in a single season with six. He also became the sixth player in NFL history to return two kicks for touchdowns in a single game. For his performance, he earned the NFC Special Teams Player of the Week Award. On a low note, kicker Robbie Gould uncharacteristically missed two field goal attempts, and the Bears announced that defensive tackle Tommie Harris would miss the remainder of the season with a severe hamstring injury.

Week 15: vs. Tampa Bay Buccaneers

The Bears improved to 12–2 and secured home field advantage throughout the NFC playoffs with an overtime victory over their former division rival Tampa Bay Buccaneers. The Bears entered the game without Pro Bowlers Mike Brown, Nathan Vasher and Tommie Harris. Additionally, Lovie Smith deactivated defensive tackle Tank Johnson due to his legal issues.

Week 16: at Detroit Lions

The Bears traveled to Detroit, Michigan in hopes of another victory over the Detroit Lions on Christmas Eve. However, the game was essentially meaningless, as the Bears had already clinched the NFC's top playoff seed in the previous week. Therefore, the Bears experimented with different defensive and offensive plans en route to a victory over the Lions.

Week 17: vs. Green Bay Packers

After their road victory against the Detroit Lions, the Bears returned home to finish their season against the archenemy Green Bay Packers. On December 24, the NFL announced that they would move to game to a primetime slot, making it the final game of the 2006 regular season. The loss marked the Bears second consecutive loss in a regular season finale. Brett Favre appeared at the end of the game, and gave a tearful interview with an NBC Sports correspondent, where he admitted his future as a professional was still questionable. Additionally, Grossman's four turnovers (including two interceptions that were returned for a touchdown), zero passer rating, and press conference comments (where he admitted to being underprepared) drew criticism both from fans and the media as the Bears' regular season came to an end.

Playoffs

The Bears clinched a playoff berth after defeating the Minnesota Vikings during week thirteen. They obtained a first round bye the following week, and later secured the NFC's first playoff seed. This ensured the Bears home field advantage for the NFC's Divisional and Conference games.

Post season schedule

NFC Divisional playoff: vs Seattle Seahawks (4)

The Bears advanced to the NFC Championship game by defeating the Seattle Seahawks on January 14, 2007. In a hard-fought battle, the Bears had to rely on all “four phases” of the game (offense, defense, special teams, and crowd noise) to win 27–24 in overtime.

NFC Championship: vs New Orleans Saints (2)

The Chicago Bears returned to Soldier Field to play the second-seeded New Orleans Saints for the right to represent the NFC in Super Bowl XLI. On a cold field with unsure footing, and eventually falling snow, the Bears defeated the Saints 39–14 to claim their first NFC Championship since the 1985 Season. After the game, Bears owner Virginia McCaskey was presented the George Halas Trophy, named after her late father, "Papa Bear" George Halas. With the win, Lovie Smith became the first African American coach to achieve a Super Bowl berth. In Super Bowl XLI, The Bears would match up against the Indianapolis Colts, and Smith would face his mentor, Tony Dungy.

Super Bowl XLI: vs Indianapolis Colts (A3)

Super Bowl XLI, the first Super Bowl to be played entirely in intemperate weather, saw the Bears lose to the Indianapolis Colts at Dolphin Stadium in Miami.

2007 Pro Bowl

Eight members of the Chicago Bears were selected to play in the 2007 Pro Bowl. Olin Kreutz, Tommie Harris, Lance Briggs, Brian Urlacher, Robbie Gould, Devin Hester, and Brendon Ayanbadejo were selected by NFL fans throughout the nation to represent the Bears. The eight selections were the most from any team in the NFC. The Bears had not sent that many players to Honolulu since the 1986 Pro Bowl, which succeeded the 1985 NFL season, when they sent nine. On January 25, Bears' left guard Ruben Brown was named to his ninth Pro Bowl, taking the spot of injured Shawn Andrews of the Philadelphia Eagles. However, Harris, Urlacher, Kreutz, and Briggs missed the Pro Bowl on the account of injuries.

Off the field incidents
Perhaps the most prevalent off-field occurrences were the actions taken by and against Tank Johnson and Ricky Manning, Jr. On December 14, 2006, Lake County police officers searched Johnson's home in Gurnee, Illinois, and discovered that he possessed six firearms, including two assault rifles. Johnson was charged with violation of probation and possessing unlicensed weapons. A Chicago media storm erupted shortly after when Johnson's bodyguard was shot and killed December 16, after attending a club with him. Bears coach Lovie Smith deactivated Johnson for the following game against the Tampa Bay Buccaneers based on the incidents. Speculation arose in Chicago that the Bears' defensive tackle would not be allowed either legally or by the team to travel to Miami to play in the Super Bowl, but he was ultimately allowed to play. Johnson eventually served 60 days in a Cook County jail because of the charges. Manning Jr. faced a similar situation that cost him a one-game suspension. On April 23, 2006, two days after receiving an offer sheet from the Bears, Manning Jr. attacked a man in a Denny's restaurant after teasing him for working on a laptop computer. In September 2006, Manning pleaded no contest to felony assault in exchange for another probation deal, though later he proclaimed his innocence.

Staff

Final roster

References

External links

 2006 Chicago Bears Schedule and Results
 Official Statistics
 2006 at BearsHistory.com
 Pro Football Reference entry

Chicago Bears
NFC North championship seasons
National Football Conference championship seasons
Chicago Bears seasons
Bear
2000s in Chicago
2006 in Illinois